Veterans' affairs is an area of public policy concerned with relations between a government and its communities of military veterans. Some jurisdictions have a designated government agency or department, a Department of Veterans' Affairs, Ministry of Veterans' Affairs, Department of Veterans Services, or the like, which oversees issues relating to veterans' affairs. These departments provide a variety of services for veterans.

Functions
The particular services provided can vary by jurisdiction, but can include things such as:

 Resolving issues regarding compensation due following service
 Provision of military pensions
 Assistance with housing
 Assistance obtaining post-service employment
 Provision of treatment for service-related injuries
 Arranging for burial in cemeteries designated for veterans

In a survey of benefits and services offered to Veterans in four English-speaking countries, Veterans Affairs Canada noted that "[w]hile each country's suite of programs is very different, there is general consistency in the services and benefits available to support a Veteran's re-establishment".

Examples
Departments for Veteran Affairs in country or state jurisdictions include:

United States Department of Veterans Affairs (departments of this type in individual US states are independent of the federal entity)
Arizona Department of Veterans' Services
Florida Department of Veterans Affairs
Illinois Department of Veterans' Affairs
Louisiana Department of Veterans Affairs
Michigan Department of Military and Veterans Affairs
New Jersey Department of Military and Veterans Affairs
Ohio Department of Veterans Services
Oklahoma Department of Veterans Affairs
Oregon Department of Veterans' Affairs
Tennessee Department of Veterans Services
West Virginia Department of Veterans Assistance
Wisconsin Department of Veterans Affairs
Department of Veterans' Affairs, Australia
Veterans Affairs Canada, Canada
Veterans Affairs Council of Taiwan
Ministry of Veterans Affairs, China
Ministry of Croatian Veterans, Croatia
Ministry of Patriots and Veterans Affairs, South Korea
Ministry of Defence and Veterans Affairs (South Sudan)
Service Personnel and Veterans Agency, United Kingdom

See also
Healthcare

References

 
Veterans' affairs ministries